Košarkaški klub I Came to Play, commonly referred to as KK I Came to Play, is a men's amateur basketball club based in Novi Sad, Serbia. They are currently competing in the 3rd-tier First Regional League, North Division.

History 
The club came to media attention in mid-2019, when they signed retired professional players Darko Miličić, Jovo Stanojević, Branko Cvetković and Dragan Ćeranić.

Home arena 

I Came to Play play their home games at the small hall of the SPC Vojvodina, which is located in Novi Sad. It has a seating capacity of 1,030.

Players

Coaches 

 Žarko Gagričić (2019–present)

Notable players 
  Darko Miličić
  Jovo Stanojević

References

External links 
 

Basketball teams in Serbia
Sport in Novi Sad
2019 establishments in Serbia
Basketball teams established in 2019